Allain Caillé (born 1944, Paris) is a French sociologist and economist. He is Professor of sociology at the University of Paris X Nanterre. He is a founding member of the Anti-Utilitarian Movement in the Social Sciences (MAUSS) and editor of the movement's monthly journal "Revue du Mauss".

Publications 
Caillé's many books have been translated into many languages among them English, Arabic, Italian, Spanish, Romanian and Portuguese.

Splendeurs et Misères des sciences sociales (Droz, Genève, 1986).
Critique de la Raison Utilitaire (La Découverte, Paris, 1989)
L'Esprit du Don (w. Jacques Godbout), La Découverte, 1992
La démission des clercs. La crise des sciences sociales et l'oubli du politique (La Découverte,1993)
Au-delà du salariat universel ; Temps choisi et revenu de citoyenneté (Démosthène/M.A.U.S.S. Caen, 1994).
Don, intérêt et désintéressement. Bourdieu, Mauss, Platon et quelques autres. (La Découverte, 1994).
Le tournant de décembre (w. Jean-Pierre Le Goff), La Découverte, 1996.
Anthropologie du don. Le tiers paradigme, Desclée de Brouwer, 2000
Association, démocratie et société civile (w. Jean-Louis Laville, Philippe Chanial et alii), La Découverte, 2 001.
Bonheur et utilité.  Histoire de la philosophie morale et politique (Edited by Alain Caillé, Christian Lazzeri et Michel Senellart), Éditions La Découverte/ 750 pages, 2001
Paix et démocratie (w. Boutros Boutros-Ghali), 2003, UNESCO, Paris.
Dé-penser l'économique. Contre le fatalisme. La Découverte, 2005.

References

1944 births
Living people
French sociologists

French male writers